Clin-Alert is a peer-reviewed academic journal that publishes papers twice a month in the field of Pharmacology. The journal's editor is Joyce Generali. It has been in publication since 1963 and is currently published by SAGE Publications.

Scope 
Clin-Alert publishes articles covering areas such as drug-drug interactions, food-drug interactions, medication errors and dietary supplements. The journal aims to provide physicians, and other health care professionals with comprehensive summaries of adverse drug reactions, drug interactions, and market withdrawals.

Abstracting and Indexing 
Clin-Alert is abstracted and indexed in the following databases:
 Academic Onefile
 General Onefile
 InfoTrac
 Scopus
 Zetoc

External links 
 

SAGE Publishing academic journals
English-language journals
Pharmacology journals